WPOV-LP (107.7 FM, "Ascend FM") is a radio station broadcasting a religious format. Licensed to Vineland, New Jersey, United States, the station serves the Vineland-Millville-Bridgeton area. The station is currently owned by Advantage Ministries, Inc. The station is also available on 97.7 FM W249BY in Bridgeton, NJ. The station features contemporary Christian music throughout the day, plus encouraging words and teachings from local ministries.

The offices are in Millville, New Jersey.

References

External links
 
 

POV-LP
POV-LP
Millville, New Jersey